Zhang Bo (born 29 August 1982) is a Chinese actor. Zhang rose to fame for his roles in television series such as Three Kingdoms (2010) and The Qin Empire III (2017).

Early life and education
Zhang was born in Beijing on August 29, 1982. He graduated from Central Academy of Drama.

Acting career
Zhang first came to public attention in 2000 at the age of 18, appearing on Tianwang Qingwang.

In 2005, he acted as Prince Calaf in Turandot and won an Excellent Performance Award at the International Drama Festival.

Zhang starred with Jia Yiping, Ma Yili and Bai Baihe in the 2006 romantic comedy drama Where Is Happiness. On film in 2006, he played opposite Jaycee Chan, Chen Bolin and Niu Mengmeng in PK.COM.CN. In the following year, he had key supporting role in the romance drama Rich Man Poor Love. 

Zhang co-starred with Zhang Fengyi, Jing Tian and You Yong in the 2009 historical drama Biography of Sun Tsu as Goujian.

In 2010, he appeared in Gao Xixi's Three Kingdoms, which earned him a Best New Actor at the Sohu Summer Teleplay Internet Festival. That same year, he starred in a television series called The Firmament of The Pleiades with Yûko Tanaka, Yu Shaoqun, Zhou Yiwei, Xu Baihui and Yin Tao. It is based on the novel by the same name by Jirō Asada. 

Zhang was cast in the romantic comedy television series Scent of a Woman (2011), playing the lover of Xu Fan's character. 

In 2013, he had a lead role in the biographical film, Falling Flowers.

In 2014, he played the male lead opposite Choo Ja-hyun in Xiu Xiu's Men.

Zhang appeared in the 2015 war television series The Waves, opposite Han Xue and Yin Xiaotian.

Zhang's big break in The Qin Empire III, in which he played King Zhaoxiang of Qin, a role which brought him much publicity. That same year, he played a supporting role in Nirvana in Fire sequel Nirvana in Fire 2, starring Huang Xiaoming, Liu Haoran, Tong Liya and Zhang Huiwen  and directed by Kong Sheng and Li Xue. 

In 2018, Zhang played King Wu of Zhou, the lead role in Shin Woo-chul's The Gods, costarring Wang Likun, Luo Jin and Yu Hewei.

Filmography

Film

Television

References

External links

1982 births
Male actors from Beijing
Living people
Central Academy of Drama alumni
21st-century Chinese male actors
Chinese male television actors
Chinese male film actors